First Appearances is an Australian television series which aired in 1962 for a short run on ABC. It was a variety series featuring acts who had not previously appeared on ABC television.  Hosted by Peter Colville, musical backing was provided by the ABC Dance Band conducted by Jim Gussey.

References

External links
First Appearances on IMDb

1962 Australian television series debuts
1962 Australian television series endings
Black-and-white Australian television shows
English-language television shows
Australian variety television shows
Australian Broadcasting Corporation original programming